Costel Mutescu (born 7 May 1974) is a Romanian rower. He competed in the men's eight event at the 2000 Summer Olympics.

References

1974 births
Living people
Romanian male rowers
Olympic rowers of Romania
Rowers at the 2000 Summer Olympics
People from Rădăuți